The Taro (Latin Tarus) is a river in Emilia-Romagna, in northern Italy. It flows almost entirely in the province of Parma, west of the city Parma. The Taro flows into the Po near Gramignazzo, a frazione of the comune of Sissa, north of Parma.

The principal affluents of the Taro are the Ceno, Recchio and Stirone; others are the Gotra and Tarodine. Both the Taro and the Ceno rise on Monte Penna, elevation , in the Apennine Mountains on the border between the provinces of Genoa and Parma.

The river shows strong seasonal variability. In summer it can easily dry, while in rainy periods it can reach a discharge of : this value can double on rare occasions, known , "centennial floods", such as that of November 9, 1982.

The Val di Taro was of strategic importance during the Middle Ages, as it was traversed by the Via Francigena, the pilgrim route and main connection between Rome and France in that era.

About  of the river course between Fornovo di Taro and Ponte Taro constitutes the protected area of the Parco fluviale Regionale del Taro, the Taro regional natural park. The area of the park includes the river bed itself, with numerous islets of sand and gravel and wetland areas, and surrounding areas of woodland, scrub and cultivated soil; it has a wide variety of vegetation and fauna.

Following the French conquest of Italy in the Napoleonic Wars, the river gave its name to a département, the Département du Taro.

References

External links
 
Taro Park Website 

Rivers of Italy
Rivers of the Province of Parma
Rivers of the Apennines
Rivers of the Province of Genoa